Nowe Ostrowy  is a village in Kutno County, Łódź Voivodeship, in central Poland. It is the seat of the gmina (administrative district) called Gmina Nowe Ostrowy.

References

Nowe Ostrowy